Nemophora istrianellus is a moth of the Adelidae family. It is found in Spain, Austria, Croatia, Bosnia and Herzegovina, Asia Minor and Israel.

References

External links
lepiforum.de
Species info at nkis.info

Moths described in 1851
Taxa named by Gustav Heinrich Heydenreich
Adelidae
Moths of Europe
Moths of Asia